Flabellobasis is a genus of snout moths. It was described by Boris Balinsky in 1991 and is known from South Africa.

Species
Flabellobasis capensis (Hampson, 1901)
Flabellobasis montana Balinsky, 1991

References

Phycitinae